This article contains a list of viceroys in Barbados from its initial colonisation in 1627 by England until it achieved independence in 1966. From 1833 to 1885, Barbados was part of the colony of the Windward Islands, and the governor of Barbados represented the monarch in all the Windward Islands. In 1885 Barbados became an independent colony again.

Governors of Barbados (1627–1833)
 Henry Powell, 17 February 1627 – 1628
 William Deane, 1628 – June 1628
 Charles Wolferstone, June 1628 – 26 February 1629
 John Powell, 26 February 1629 – 29 August 1629
 Robert Wheatley, 29 August 1629 – September 1629, acting
 Sir William Tufton, 21 December 1629 – 16 July 1630
 Henry Hawley, 1630 – June 1640
 Richard Peers, 1633–1634, acting for Hawley
 William Hawley, 1638–1639, acting for Henry Hawley
 Sir Henry Huncks, June 1640 – 1641
 Philip Bell, 1641–1650
 Francis Willoughby, 5th Baron Willoughby of Parham, May 1650 – 1651, in dissidence to January 1652
 Sir George Ayscue, October 1651 – 1652
 Daniel Searle, 1652 – July 1660, acting
 Thomas Modyford, July 1660–1660, acting
 Humphrey Walrond, 1660 – August 1663, acting
 Francis Willoughby, 5th Baron Willoughby of Parham, August 1663 – 23 July 1666, restored
 Henry Willoughby, 1664, acting for the Lord Willoughby of Parham
 Henry Willoughby, July 1666–1667, acting, second time
 William Willoughby, 6th Baron Willoughby of Parham, 1667, acting
 Samuel Barwick, 1667, acting
 Henry Hawley, 1667 – April 1667, acting, second time
 William Willoughby, 6th Baron Willoughby of Parham, April 1667 – 1673
 Christopher Codrington, 1668–1669, acting for Lord Willoughby of Parham
 Sir Peter Colleton, 1673–1674, acting
 Sir Jonathan Atkins, 1674–1679
 Sir John Witham, 1680–1683, acting
 Sir Richard Dutton, 1683–1685
 Edwyn Stede, 1685–1690, acting
 James Kendall, 1690–1694
 Francis Russell, 1694–1696
 Francis Bond, 1696 – December 1697, acting
 Ralph Grey, December 1697 – 1701
 John Farmer, 1701–1703, acting
 Sir Bevil Granville, 1703–1706
 Mitford Crowe, 1707–1710
 George Lillington, 1710–1711, acting
 Robert Lowther, 1711–1720
 William Sharpe, January 1714–1715, acting for Lowther
 John Frere, 1720–1721, acting
 Samuel Cox, 1721–1722, acting
 Henry Worsley, 1722–1727
 Thomas Catesby Paget, 1727–1731
 James Dotin, 1731, acting, first time
 Walter Chetwynd, 1731–1732
 The Viscount Howe, 1733–29 March 1735
 James Dotin, 1735–1737, acting, second time
 Orlando Bridgeman, 1737–1738
 Humphrey Howarth, 1738
 The Viscount Gage, 1738–1739
 Robert Byng, May 1739 – 1740
 James Dotin, 1740, acting, third time
 Sir Thomas Robinson, 1742–1747
 Henry Grenville, 1747–1756
 Charles Pinfold, 1756–1766
 Samuel Rous, 1766–1768, acting, first time
 William Spry, 1768–1772
 Samuel Rous, 1772, acting, second time
 Edward Hay, 1772–1779
 John Dotin, 1779–1780, acting, first time
 James Cunninghame, 1780–1782
 John Dotin, 1783–1784, acting, second time
 David Parry, 1784–1793
 William Bishop, 1793–1794, acting, first time
 George Poyntz Ricketts, 1794–1800
 William Bishop, 1800–1801, acting, second time
 Francis Humberstone Mackenzie, 1802–1806
 John Spooner, 1806–1810, acting
 Sir George Beckwith, 1810–1815
 Sir James Leith, 10 May 1815 – 16 October 1816
 John Foster Alleyne, 1817, acting
 The Lord Combermere, 1817–1820
 John Brathwaite Skeete, 1820, acting
 Samuel Hinds, 1821, acting
 Sir Henry Warde, 1821–1829
 Sir James Frederick Lyon, 1829–1833

Governors of Barbados and the Windward Islands (1833–1885)
In 1833, Barbados became part of the newly formed colony of the Windward Islands, and the Governor of Barbados became viceroy over the new colony as well.

 Sir Lionel Smith, 1833–1836
 Sir Evan John Murray MacGregor, 1836–1841
 Charles Henry Darling, 1841
 Sir Charles Edward Grey, 1841–1846
 William Reid, 1846–1848
 William MacBean George Colebrooke, 1848–1856
 Francis Hincks, 1856–4 January 1862
 James Walker, 4 January 1862 – 1868
 Rawson William Rawson, 1868–1875
 Sanford Freeling, 1875, acting
 Sir John Pope Hennessy, 1875–1876
 George Cumine Strahan, 1876–1880
 D. J. Gamble, 1880, acting
 William Robinson, 1880–1885

Governors of Barbados (1885–1966)
In 1885, Barbados's oversight of the Windward Islands was ended, and a separate Governor of the Windward Islands was installed in Grenada.

 Sir Charles Cameron Lees, 1885–1889
 Sir Walter Joseph Sendall, 1889–1891
 Sir James Shaw Hay, 1891–1900
 Sir Frederick Mitchell Hodgson, November 1900 – 1904
 Sir Gilbert Thomas Carter, 14 October 1904 – 1911
 Sir Leslie Probyn, 13 February 1911 – 1918
 Sir Charles Richard Mackey O'Brien, 27 September 1918 – 1925
 Sir William Charles Fleming Robertson, 31 December 1925 – 21 January 1933
 Harry Scott Newlands, 21 January 1933 – 12 March 1933
 Sir Mark Aitchison Young, 5 August 1933 – March 1938
 Sir Eubule John Waddington, 6 August 1938 – 1941
 Sir Henry Grattan Bushe, 23 October 1941 – 1947
 Sir Hilary Rudolph Robert Blood, 5 February 1947 – 1949
 Sir Alfred Savage, 1 November 1949 – 1953
 Brigadier Sir Robert Arundell, 14 May 1953 – 1959
 Sir John Montague Stow, 8 October 1959 – 29 November 1966

On 30 November 1966, Barbados achieved independence from the United Kingdom. For a list of viceroys in Barbados after independence, see Governor-General of Barbados.

See also 

 List of Colonial Secretaries of Barbados
 List of Governors of the British Windward Islands
 Governor-General of the West Indies Federation

Notes

References
http://www.rulers.org/rulb1.html#barbados
http://www.worldstatesmen.org/Barbados.html

 

Colonial government in Barbados
 
Governors
Barbados